The 119th (The Prince's Own) Regiment of Foot was an infantry regiment of the British Army, formed in 1761 by the regimentation of independent companies and disbanded in 1763.

References

External links

Infantry regiments of the British Army
Military units and formations established in 1761
Military units and formations disestablished in 1763